Meithalun (transliteration: Meithalûn; also spelled Maythalun, Maithaloun or Meithalon) is a Palestinian town in the Jenin Governorate in the northern West Bank, located 26 kilometers south of Jenin. According to the Palestinian Central Bureau of Statistics (PCBS) census, the town had a population of 6,995 in 2007.

Meithalun has four mosques, six schools, four pharmacies, two weather stations, two kindergartens, two clinics: maternity and general, several workshops, two multipurpose halls, two cemeteries, a police station, an office of the Ministry of Interior, three bakeries, four Internet cafes, two cultural centers, two major diwans, and a bank (Bank of Palestine). The town occupies an area of around 12,495 dunums.

Etymology
According to E. H. Palmer, Meithalun's name derives from Mithilihieh, which in Phoenician means "an image". The classical Arabic translation is "traces of a dwelling which are becoming effaced".

History
Pottery from the Roman and Byzantine periods in Palestine have been found in the old core of Meithalun.

Crusader era
Meithalun was referred to "Gastine Medeclala" and "Gastine Mesdedula" by the Crusaders. King Amalric I apportioned half of the site to the Crusader lord Guido and the other half to another lord known as Gilbert of Neapolis. In 1186, it became part of the Jeoshafat Abbey after it was purchased from Guido.

Ottoman era
Meithalun was incorporated into the Ottoman Empire with the rest of Palestine in 1517. In the 1596 Ottoman tax records, Meithalun had a population of 16 families and one bachelor. The entire population were Muslim. They paid a fixed tax-rate of 33.3% on agricultural products, including wheat, barley, summer crops, olive trees, goats and beehives, in addition to occasional revenues; a total of 7,160  akçe.

During the later Ottoman era, Meithalun was part of the Mashariq Jarrar subdistrict and in the 19th century was in the zone of influence of the Nablus-based textile merchant Hajj Isma'il Arafat, along with the villages of Sanur, Beit Lid, Silat ad-Dhahr and Jaba'. In 1838, Biblical scholar Edward Robinson saw the village when he travelled in the region, and  described it as being situated in an extremely fertile area. He listed  it as part of the District of Haritheh, north of Nablus.

In 1851–52, French archaeologist Louis Félicien de Saulcy noted that Meithalun was one of two villages in the southern part of the Marj Sanur valley, the other village being Sir. He describes the Marj Sanur valley as being “enclosed within a belt of mountains of a very woody and agreeable aspect.” In 1870, French explorer Victor Guérin described Meithalun as “a small village on a low hill. The Sheikh’s house is well built, and some of the rock-hewn cisterns are presumably ancient." In 1882, the PEF's Survey of Western Palestine described it as “a village of moderate size, of stones and adobe, with a well to the north, situated at the foot of a high hill, with a few olives in the plain”.

British Mandate era
British forces gained control of Palestine in 1917, during World War I, and later governed it as the British Mandate of Palestine. Meithalun's population in the 1922 census of Palestine, conducted  by the British Mandate authorities, was 682, rising to 938 (193 households) in the 1931 census. In the latter census, the hamlet of Kheibar was counted with Meithalun. In both censuses, the entire population was Muslim.

Meithalun's two main clans, the Na'irat and the Ruba'iya, participated in the countrywide 1936–1939 revolt against British rule and increased Zionist settlement in Palestine. Rebels from the Na'irat clan, who had ties to the Jarrar family, fought under commander Fawzi Jarrar of Jaba', while the Ruba'iya fought under the Qassamite commander Abu Khalid of Silat ad-Dhahr and Abu Saysan of Qabatiya. The latter was a traditional ally of the Abd al-Hadi clan, who had economic and political ties to the Ruba'iya.

In the 1945 statistics the population was 1,360, all Muslims, with 12,495 dunams of land, according to an official land and population survey. Of the village's lands, 3,451 dunams were used for plantations and irrigable land, 7,469 dunams for cereals, while 25 dunams were built-up (urban) areas.

Jordanian era

In the wake of the 1948 Arab–Israeli War, and after the 1949 Armistice Agreements, Meithalun came under Jordanian rule.

In 1961, the population of Meithalun was  2,243.

1967, aftermath
Meithalun has been under Israeli occupation since the 1967 Six-Day War. In 1989, during the First Intifada, Israeli troops shot dead Abdallah Rabaya'h, a resident of Meithalun, during clashes between locals and troops as the latter attempted to dismantle a road block set up in the village.

In the 2005 municipal elections, Fatah won the largest number of seats (five), followed by the Popular Front for the Liberation of Palestine (four) and Hamas (three). Political independents won one seat. The mayor is PFLP member Fawaz Saleh Na'irat and the deputy mayor is Hamas member Jihad Saleh Rabay'a.

Geography
Meithalun is located in the northern West Bank, about 17 kilometers south of Jenin, the capital of the Jenin Governorate to which Meithalun belongs. The nearest localities to Meithalun are Sanur to the west, Siris and Judeida to the southeast, Aqqaba to the east, Sir and Zababdeh to the northeast, and Misilyah to the north.

The town is situated along the western edge of Marj Sanur, a valley and seasonal lake. It is the largest locality, of seven total, bordering Marj Sanur and controls the largest share of its fertile lands. It has an average elevation of 385 meters above sea level and is not elevated from its immediate surroundings. The total land area of Meithalun is 12,495 dunams. The old core of the town consists of 18 dunams. Khirbet Khaybar, to the northeast of the town, is part of Meithalun's jurisdiction. It has an elevation of 423 meters above sea level and consists of ruins, namely the remains of a wall, building foundations, a tomb and water tanks cut from stone.

Demographics
Meithalun had a population of 5,218 in the 1997 census by the Palestinian Central Bureau of Statistics (PCBS). Palestinian refugees and their descendants accounted for 5.4% of the inhabitants. In the 2007 PCBS census, Meithalun's population grew to 6,955. The number of households was 1,258, with each household containing an average of between five and six persons. Women made up 48.3% of the population and men 51.7%.

References

Bibliography

External links
Meithalun Website
Meithalon Municipality Website
Welcome to Meithaloun
Maythalun, Welcome to Palestine
Survey of Western Palestine, Map 11: IAA, Wikimedia commons

Villages in the West Bank
Jenin Governorate
Municipalities of the State of Palestine